In molecular biology, the calcipressin family of proteins negatively regulate calcineurin by direct binding. They are essential for the survival of T helper type 1 cells. Calcipressin 1 is a phosphoprotein that increases its capacity to inhibit calcineurin when phosphorylated at the conserved FLISPP motif; this phosphorylation also controls the half-life of calcipressin 1 by accelerating its degradation.

In humans, the Calcipressins family of proteins is derived from three genes. Calcipressin 1 is also known as modulatory calcineurin-interacting protein 1 (MCIP1), Adapt78 and Down syndrome critical region 1 (DSCR1). Calcipressin 2 is variously known as MCIP2, ZAKI-4 and DSCR1-like 1. Calcipressin 3 is also called MCIP3 and DSCR1-like 2.

References

Protein families